The 2017 SAFF U-15 Championship was the 4th edition of the SAFF U-15 Championship, an international football competition for men's under-15 national teams organized by SAFF. Since most teams use to send their U-15 team keeping in mind 2018 AFC U-16 Championship qualification it has been officially changed to U-15 tournament. The tournament was hosted by Nepal from 18–27 of August, 2017 at ANFA Complex, Satdobato and Halchowk Stadium. Six teams from the region took part, divided into two groups.

Host selection
On July 10, 2017, a tournament draw ceremony was held in the conference room of the Bangladesh Football Federation. 

SAFF general secretary Anwarul Haque Helal and BFF general secretary Abu Nayeem Shohag, were among others present on the occasion.

Eligible teams

  
 
 
  (Host)

Player eligibility
Players born on or after 1 January 2002 were eligible to compete in the tournament.

Participating teams

Venues

Match officials
Referees
  Kabin Byanjankar
  Golam Mourshed Choidhary
  Abdulla Shathir
  D.D.Indika Sendanayake
  Tanmoy Dhar
  Ugyen Dorji

Assistant referees
  Nani Ram Thapa
  Kuldeep Tariyal
  Md Shafikul Islam
  K.L.S.Chathuranga 
  Abdulla Suneed
  Phurpa Wangchuk

Group stage
All matches were played in Lalitpur, Nepal.
Times listed are UTC+05:45.

Group A

Group B

Bracket

Knockout stage

Semi-finals

Third place

Final

Winner

Awards
The following awards were given for the 2017 SAFF U-15 Championship.

Goalscorers

 6 Goals
  Foysal Ahmed Fahim

 5 Goals
  Vikram Pratap Singh

 4 Goals

  Akash Budha Magar
  Brijesh Chaudhary
  Miraj Molla

 3 Goals
  Ravi Bahadur Rana 

 2 Goals

  Dorji Khando
  Kelzang Jigmi
  Roshan Rana Magar
  Lalrokima
  Raja Sheikh

 1 Goal

  Nazmul Biswas
  Habibur Rahman
  Thoiba Singh Moirangthem
  Ricky Shabong
  Kinga Wangchuk
  Siddharth Gurung
  Darshan Gurung
  Harpreet Singh
  Ridge Melvin D'Mello
  Md Akash
  Yeasin Arafat 
  Arif Hossen 

 2 Own Goals
  Ibrahim Anoof (playing against )

 Own Goal
  Nazmul Biswas (playing against )

References

2017
2017 in Asian football
2017
2016–17 in Nepalese football
2016–17 in Indian football
2017 in Bhutanese football
2017 in Bangladeshi football
2017 in Maldivian football
2017 in youth association football